Phallichthys is a genus of poeciliids native to Central America.

Species
There are currently four recognized species in this genus:
 Phallichthys amates (N. Miller, 1907) (Merry widow livebearer)
 Phallichthys fairweatheri D. E. Rosen & R. M. Bailey, 1959 (Picotee livebearer)
 Phallichthys quadripunctatus W. A. Bussing, 1979
 Phallichthys tico W. A. Bussing, 1963

References

Poeciliidae
Fish of Central America
Freshwater fish genera
Taxa named by Carl Leavitt Hubbs
Ray-finned fish genera